Anisancylus is a genus of small, freshwater, air-breathing limpets, aquatic pulmonate gastropod molluscs in the family Planorbidae, the ram's horn snails and their allies.

Anatomy 
These animals have a pallial lung, as do all pulmonate snails, but they also have a false gill or "pseudobranch" which can serve perfectly well as a gill when they are unable to reach the surface for air.

Species 
Species within the genus Anisancylus include:

 Anisancylus dutrae Santos, 1994 
 Anisancylus obliquus Broderip & Sowerby, 1832

References

Planorbidae